Headquarters House may refer to:

Hong Kong 
 Headquarters House (Hong Kong), Commander of British Forces Hong Kong

Jamaica 
 Hibbert House, also known as Headquarters House, head office of the Jamaica National Heritage Trust

United States 
 Headquarters House (Fayetteville, Arkansas), listed on the NRHP in Washington County, Arkansas
 Garden Club of Georgia Museum-Headquarters House, Founder's Memorial Garden, Athens, Georgia, listed on the NRHP in Clarke County, Georgia
 Headquarters House (Boston), a National Historic Landmark listed on the NRHP